Macroglossum nigellum is a moth of the  family Sphingidae. It is known from Indonesia (including Java and Sulawesi).

Subspecies
Macroglossum nigellum nigellum
Macroglossum nigellum integrifasciatum Hogenes & Treadaway, 1996 (Sulawesi)
Macroglossum nigellum speideli Eitschberger, 2006 (Sulawesi)

References

Macroglossum
Moths described in 1916